The Rail-to-Rail Route is an under-construction  rail-trail bike path and pedestrian trail in Los Angeles County, California. 

The route runs through the city of Inglewood, the city of Los Angeles neighborhoods of Hyde Park, Chesterfield Square, Harvard Park, Vermont-Slauson, South Park and Central-Alameda, and unincorporated Florence-Firestone.

The route will connect  Fairview Heights,  Slauson station, and  Slauson station. The K Line and A Line are light-rail routes; the J Line is a rapid-transit bus corridor.

The path uses the Harbor Subdivision freight-train right-of-way along Slauson Avenue and Hyde Park Boulevard. The planned "active transportation corridor" will be a -wide linear park.

The budget for the project is $140 million. Projected completion is 2024.

A potential future extension, called the Rail-to-River Route, would run through some combination of Gateway Cities Huntington Park, Vernon, Maywood and Bell to reach the Los Angeles River bike trails.

See also
 Rail with trail
 List of Los Angeles bike paths

References

External links
 metro.net Rail-to-Rail Active Transportation Corridor
Rail-to-River (planning stage)

Rail trails in California
Bike paths in Los Angeles
South Los Angeles